Several ships have been named British Tar an alternative nickname for British sailors to Jack Tar:

  was launched at Shields and made five voyages as a whaler and several as a West Indiaman. She then became a general trader. She was lost on 29 January 1818.
  was built in Plymouth (probably Plymouth, Massachusetts). She sailed from Bristol in 1805 on a slave trading voyage during which the French captured her. She became the privateer Revanche, out of Guadeloupe. The British captured Revanche in 1808.
  was built by Lockwood Brodrick (Late), at South Shields. She was last listed in 1811.
  was launched in 1793 in Spain under another name and taken in prize. In 1806 she was on a voyage from Labrador to the Mediterranean when a French squadron captured and burnt her.
  was launched at Whitby in 1814. She became a Liverpool-based merchantman, trading across the Atlantic with North America until she was wrecked in August 1840.  
 , of 383–395 tons (bm), was a brig launched at Sunderland. In 1834 she made a voyage carrying immigrants to Canada under the Petworth Emigration Scheme. She was last listed in 1863.

Ship names